Richard Enthoven (1937 – 2 December 2022) was a South African billionaire businessman who was the owner of the casual dining chain Nando's, the Hollard Group of insurance companies, and Spier Wine Farm.

Early life
Richard Enthoven was the son of Robert Enthoven, a South African entrepreneur who "amassed an insurance fortune", with his company Robert Enthoven Insurance Brokers.

Business interests
The Enthoven family owns Nando's casual dining chain, Spier Wine Farm and the Hollard Group of insurance companies. The family has a material ownership stake in the Telesure Group.

In March 2015, Bloomberg estimated his net worth at US$1.1 billion.

Personal life and death
Enthoven had three children; Robby, Adrian, and Mariota. Robby Enthoven heads the UK operations for Nando’s. Adrian Enthoven was educated at Oxford University and is now chairman of Hollard Group. Mariota Enthoven is married to Angus McIntosh and they run the Spier Biodynamic Farm.

Enthoven had a collection of 5,000 South African artworks.

Dick Enthoven died from cancer on 2 December 2022, at the age of 85.

References

Further reading 
 

1937 births
2022 deaths
Alumni of the London School of Economics
South African billionaires
South African businesspeople
South African people of Dutch descent
University of Southern California alumni
White South African anti-apartheid activists
Members of the House of Assembly (South Africa)
United Party (South Africa) politicians